Stone Hill Historic District is a national historic district in Baltimore, Maryland, United States. It is one of the original mill villages along the Jones Falls, having been developed circa 1845–1847 to house textile mill workers. Comprising seven blocks, the district includes 21 granite duplexes, a granite Superintendent's House, and a granite service building (now converted to a duplex)all owned by Mount Vernon Mills from 1845 to 1925.

It was added to the National Register of Historic Places in 2001.

References

External links
, including photo dated 2000, at Maryland Historical Trust
Boundary Map of the Stone Hill Historic District, Baltimore City, at Maryland Historical Trust

Historic districts on the National Register of Historic Places in Baltimore
Georgian architecture in Maryland